Samuel Houston Adams (July 25, 1928 – November 13, 2015) was a Canadian football player who played for the BC Lions. Adams played 28 games with the Lions from 1954 to 1955, catching 53 receptions for 834 yards. He played college football at Whitworth University. He later moved to Pullman, Washington and was an educator. Adams died in 2015, aged 87.

Head coaching record

References

1928 births
2015 deaths
American football ends
Canadian football ends
BC Lions players
Washington State Cougars football coaches
Whitworth Pirates football coaches
Whitworth Pirates football players
Players of American football from Fort Worth, Texas
Players of Canadian football from Texas